John Clifton "Jack" Bogle (May 8, 1929 – January 16, 2019) was an American investor, business magnate, and philanthropist. He was the founder and chief executive of The Vanguard Group, and is credited with creating the index fund. An avid investor and money manager himself, he preached investment over speculation, long-term patience over short-term action, and reducing broker fees as much as possible. The ideal investment vehicle for Bogle was a low-cost index fund held over a lifetime with dividends reinvested and purchased with dollar cost averaging.

His 1999 book Common Sense on Mutual Funds: New Imperatives for the Intelligent Investor became a bestseller and is considered a classic within the investment community.

Early life and education
John Bogle was born on May 8, 1929, in Montclair, New Jersey, to William Yates Bogle, Jr. and Josephine Lorraine Hipkins.

His family was harmed by the Great Depression. They lost their money and had to sell their home, with his father falling into alcoholism, which resulted in his parents' divorce.

Bogle and his twin, David, attended Manasquan High School near the New Jersey shore for a time. Their academic record there enabled them to transfer to Blair Academy on work scholarships. At Blair, Bogle showed a particular aptitude for mathematics, with numbers and computations fascinating him. In 1947, Bogle graduated from Blair Academy cum laude and was accepted at Princeton University, where he studied economics and investment. During his university years, Bogle studied the mutual fund industry. Bogle spent his junior and senior years working on his thesis "The Economic Role of the Investment Company".

Bogle graduated magna cum laude from Princeton in 1951 and was soon hired by Walter L. Morgan, founder of the Wellington Fund, reportedly as a result of Morgan reading his 130-page thesis paper.

Investment career

After graduating from Princeton, Bogle sought a position in banking or investments. Hired by Morgan at the Wellington Fund, Bogle was  promoted to assistant manager in 1955, at which time he was able to analyze the company and its investment department. Bogle persuaded the Wellington management to change its strategy of concentration on a single fund and create a new fund. Eventually he succeeded, and the new fund became a turning point in his career. After successfully climbing through the ranks, Bogle replaced Morgan as chairman of Wellington in 1970, but was later fired for an "extremely unwise" merger that he had approved. It was a poor decision which he later considered his biggest mistake, stating, "The great thing about that mistake, which was shameful and inexcusable and a reflection of immaturity and confidence beyond what the facts justified, was that I learned a lot."

In 1974, Bogle founded The Vanguard Group, which is now one of the most respected and successful companies in the investment world. In 1999, Fortune magazine named Bogle as "one of the four investment giants of the twentieth century".

In 1976, influenced by the works of Paul Samuelson, Bogle created the First Index Investment Trust (a precursor to the Vanguard 500 Index Fund) as the first index mutual fund available to the general public. It was not immediately well received by individuals or the investment industry, but is now lauded by investment-legend Warren Buffett, among others. In a 2005 speech, Samuelson ranked "this Bogle invention along with the invention of the wheel, the alphabet, Gutenberg printing".

Bogle suffered heart issues in the 1990s, subsequently relinquishing his role as Vanguard CEO in 1996. His successor was John J. Brennan, his handpicked successor and second-in-command, whom he had hired in 1982. Bogle, who was then 66 and "considered past the age for a healthy heart transplant", had a successful heart transplant in 1996.

His subsequent return to Vanguard with the title of senior chairman led to conflict between Bogle and Brennan. Bogle left the company in 1999 and moved to Bogle Financial Markets Research Center, a small research institute not directly connected to Vanguard but located on the Vanguard campus.

Investment philosophy 
In creating the index mutual fund in 1975, Bogle's idea was that instead of beating the index and charging high costs, the index fund would mimic the index performance over the long run—thus achieving higher returns with lower costs than the costs associated with actively managed funds.

Bogle's idea of index investing offers a clear yet prominent distinction between investment and speculation. The main difference between investment and speculation lies in the time horizon and the risk of capital. Investment is concerned with capturing returns on the long run with lower risk of destruction of capital, while speculation is concerned with achieving returns over a short period of time, with potentially destructive risk to capital. The speculator is often only concerned with the price of a security and not the underlying business as a whole, while the investor is concerned with the underlying business and not the price of the security. Even if a business is steady in cash flow, the market quotations of a security are anything but, as a result of speculators driving up prices and bringing down prices based on hope, fear and greed. Bogle believed this is an important analysis to be taken into account as short-term, risky investments have been flooding the financial markets.

Bogle was known for his insistence, in numerous media appearances and in writing, on the superiority of index funds over traditional actively managed mutual funds. He contended that it is folly to attempt to pick actively managed mutual funds and expect their performance to beat a low-cost index fund over a long period of time, after accounting for the fees that actively managed funds charge.

Bogle argued for an approach to investing defined by simplicity and common sense. Below are his eight basic rules for investors:
 Select low-cost funds
 Consider carefully the added costs of advice
 Do not overrate past fund performance
 Use past performance to determine consistency and risk
 Beware of stars (as in, star mutual fund managers)
 Beware of asset size
 Don't own too many funds
 Buy your fund portfolio – and hold it

His investment philosophy is the founding principle of the eponymous "Bogleheads" forum. This group is now supported by the John C. Bogle Center for Financial Literacy and hosts national conferences in addition to its online forum. Members of the group have collaborated to write three books expanding upon Bogle's investment philosophy.

Later in his life, Bogle expressed concerns that the growing popularity of passive indexing would lead to a concentration of corporate voting power for leaders of the three largest investment firms (Vanguard, BlackRock, and State Street), adding, "I do not believe that such a concentration would serve the national interest."

Personal life 
Bogle married Eve Sherrerd on September 22, 1956, and had six children: Barbara, Jean, John Clifton, Nancy, Sandra, and Andrew. They resided in Bryn Mawr, Pennsylvania.

At age 31, Bogle suffered from his first of several heart attacks, and at age 38, he was diagnosed with the rare heart disease arrhythmogenic right ventricular dysplasia. He received a heart transplant in 1996 at age 66.

Bogle was a member of the board of trustees at Blair Academy. He was an advisory board member of the Millstein Center for Corporate Governance and Performance at the Columbia Law School. Bogle received honorary doctorates from Princeton University in 2005 and Villanova University in 2011. Bogle served on the board of trustees of the National Constitution Center in Philadelphia, a museum dedicated to the U.S. Constitution. He had previously served as chairman of the board from 1999 through 2007. He was named chairman emeritus in January 2007, when former president George H. W. Bush was named chairman.

Politically, Bogle was a Republican (a self-described Teddy Roosevelt Republican), although he voted for Bill Clinton, Barack Obama in 2008 and 2012, and Hillary Clinton in 2016. He supported the Volcker rule and tighter rules on money market funds, and was critical of what he believed was the US government's lack of regulation of the financial sector. Bogle said the current system in the US had "gotten out of balance", and advocated for "taxes to discourage short-term speculation, limits on leverage, transparency for financial derivatives, stricter punishments for financial crimes, and a unified fiduciary standard for all money managers". In 2017, Bogle stated that President Donald Trump's policies were good for the market in the short term, but dangerous for society as a whole in the long term.

Bogle died on January 16, 2019, at his home in Bryn Mawr, Pennsylvania. After Bogle's death, Warren Buffett attributed Bogle's contribution to help individual investors to steer in a better "direction" in the field of investing. "Jack did more for American investors as a whole than any individual I've known", Buffett told in a CNBC interview. Bogle was also previously mentioned in Berkshire Hathaway's 2016 annual shareholder letter for his contribution of developing the investment landscape.

Philanthropy 
During his high-earning years at Vanguard, he regularly gave half his salary to charity, including Blair Academy and Princeton. In 2016, the Bogle Fellowship was established at Princeton University by John C. Bogle Jr, Bogle's son. The fellowship sponsors 20 first year students in each class.

Awards and honors
 Named one of the investment industry's four "Giants of the 20th Century" by Fortune magazine in 1999.
 Awarded the Woodrow Wilson Award from Princeton University for "distinguished achievement in the Nation's service" (1999).
 Named one of the "world's 100 most powerful and influential people" by Time magazine in 2004.
 Institutional Investor's Lifetime Achievement Award (2004).
Elected to the American Philosophical Society (2004).

Bibliography 
 Bogle on Mutual Funds: New Perspectives for the Intelligent Investor (McGraw-Hill, 1993), 
 Slater, Robert. The Vanguard Experiment: John Bogle's Quest to Transform the Mutual Fund Industry. Chicago, IL: Irwin Professional Publishing, Inc., 1997.
 Common Sense on Mutual Funds: New Imperatives for the Intelligent Investor (John Wiley & Sons, 1999), 
 John Bogle on Investing: The First 50 Years (McGraw-Hill, 2000), 
 Character Counts: The Creation and Building of The Vanguard Group (McGraw-Hill, 2002) 
 The Battle for the Soul of Capitalism (Yale University Press, 2005), 
 The Little Book of Common Sense Investing: The Only Way to Guarantee Your Fair Share of Stock Market Returns (John Wiley & Sons, 2007), 
 Enough : True Measures of Money, Business, and Life (John Wiley & Sons, 2008), 
 Common Sense on Mutual Funds: Fully Updated 10th Anniversary Edition (John Wiley & Sons, 2009), 
 Don't Count on it!: Reflections on Investment Illusions, Capitalism, "Mutual" Funds, Indexing, Entrepreneurship, Idealism, and Heroes (John Wiley & Sons, 2010) 
 Braham, Lewis. The House That Jack Built: how John Bogle and Vanguard reinvented the mutual fund industry. McGraw-Hill, 2011.
 The Clash of the Cultures: Investment vs. Speculation (John Wiley & Sons, 2012) 
 Rostad, Knut A. The Man in the Arena, Vanguard Founder John C. Bogle and His Lifelong Battle to Serve Investors First. John Wiley and Sons, Inc., Hoboken, N.J. 2013.
 The Little Book of Common Sense Investing: The Only Way to Guarantee Your Fair Share of Stock Market Returns 10th Anniversary Edition, Updated and Revised (John Wiley & Sons, 2017), 
 Stay the Course: The Story of Vanguard and the Index Revolution (John Wiley & Sons, 2018) 
 Balchunas, Eric. The Bogle Effect (Penguin Random House, 2022)

References

External links

 
John C. Bogle Papers at the Seeley G. Mudd Manuscript Library, Princeton University
Remarks before the Harvard Club of Boston, January 14, 2003
Venture Voice podcast interview, February 23, 2006

Video: Speech at Pepperdine University
Investopedia Profile
That's Why They Call It Vanguard – Bloomberg

1929 births
2019 deaths
American chief executives of financial services companies
American investors
American money managers
Blair Academy alumni
Businesspeople from New Jersey
Businesspeople from Philadelphia
Manasquan High School alumni
Pennsylvania Republicans
People from Montclair, New Jersey
People from Verona, New Jersey
Princeton University alumni
University of Pennsylvania alumni
The Vanguard Group
20th-century American businesspeople
20th-century American philanthropists
Members of the American Philosophical Society